An eel buck or eel basket is a type of fish trap that was prevalent in the River Thames in England up to the 20th century. It was used particularly to catch eels, which were a staple part of the London diet.

Eel bucks were baskets made of willow wood, and were often strung together in a fishing weir. Construction of such weirs was outlawed under the terms of Magna Carta:

 All fish-weirs shall be removed from the Thames, the Medway, and throughout the whole of England, except on the sea coast.

However the practice continued unabated, often with adverse effects on navigation.

Several islands in the River Thames reflect the presence of bucks at those points; for example, Buck Ait and Handbuck Eyot.

See also
 Eel ladder
 Putcher

References

Fishing equipment
Fishing techniques and methods